Ingrid Holkovičová (born 5 December 1959) is a Slovak gymnast. She competed in six events at the 1976 Summer Olympics.

References

1959 births
Living people
Slovak female artistic gymnasts
Olympic gymnasts of Czechoslovakia
Gymnasts at the 1976 Summer Olympics
Sportspeople from Bratislava